Manlio Legat (30 August 1889 – 17 December 1955) was an Italian track and field athlete who competed in the 1912 Summer Olympics in the decathlon, pole vault and long jump. He did not finish the decathlon, after failing to start the high jump, the fourth of the ten events. He finished tied 23rd in pole vault qualifying, and finished 29th in long jump, with the shortest distance recorded.

See also 
 Italy at the 1912 Summer Olympics

References

External links
 

1889 births
1955 deaths
Italian decathletes
Italian male pentathletes
Italian male pole vaulters
Italian male long jumpers
Olympic athletes of Italy
Athletes (track and field) at the 1912 Summer Olympics
Olympic decathletes